Marek Lukáš (born 16 July 1991) is a Czech athlete competing in the combined events. He represented his country at three outdoor and one indoor European Championships.

International competitions

Personal bests
Outdoor
100 metres – 10.98 (+1.1 m/s, Kladno 2014)
400 metres – 49.74 (Ribeira Brava 2014)
1500 metres – 4:31.63 (Ribeira Brava 2014)
110 metres hurdles – 14.27 (+0.9 m/s, Kladno 2016)
High jump – 1.93 (Kladno 2015)
Pole vault – 4.80 (Prague 2016)
Long jump – 7.17 (+0.8 m/s, Kladno 2013)
Shot put – 14.71 (Prague 2016)
Discus throw – 42.59 (Kladno 2018)
Javelin throw – 73.28 (Ustí Nad Orlicí 2013)
Decathlon – 7903 (Kladno 2016)

Indoor
60 metres – 6.93 (Prague 2015)
200 metres – 22.65 (Prague 2014)
1000 metres – 2:44.11 (Prague 2017)
60 metres hurdles – 7.94 (Ostrava 2016)
High jump – 1.98 (Prague 2015)
Pole vault – 4.90 (Prague 2017)
Long jump – 7.22 (Prague 2018)
Shot put – 14.91 (Prague 2017)
Heptathlon – 5883 (Prague 2015)

References

1991 births
Living people
Czech decathletes
Charles University alumni